The Treasure is a 1923 silent German drama film directed by G. W. Pabst. It was Pabst's debut film as a director.

Plot
Master Bell-founder Balthasar Hofer, his wife Anna, their daughter Beate and his journeyman Svetelenz live in a house rebuilt after its destruction by the Ottomans in 1683. The Master tells that it is rumoured that a treasure had been buried at the time. Svetelenz, who is convinced that the treasure is hidden in the house, hopes that if he finds it, he will be able to marry Beate.

Young goldsmith journeyman Arno comes to the village to work on the ornamentation of the clock just cast by the Master. Soon, he and Beate fall in love. One night, they see Svetelenz looking for the treasure with a dowsing rod. Beate convinces Arno that he should find the treasure in order to marry her. Arno deducts that a treasure dating from the Ottomans time can only be hidden in the foundations and soon finds the place where it seems to be hidden. Svetelenz tells the Master that he has found the treasure and that they should get rid of the goldsmith who also knows about it.

After trying unsuccessfully to burn Arno alive with molten metal, they send him out of the house with Beate to fetch wine while they dig out the treasure. When Arno and Beate come back home, they find the master, his wife and Svetelenz celebrating their discovery. Svetelenz offers his share of the treasure to marry Beate, but she replies that she is not for sale. Arno threatens them with a knife to have his share of the treasure but Beate tells him that he should let them have the gold and she leaves the house. After a moment of hesitation, Arno follows her and they walk away together.

The Master and his wife take the treasure to their room and Svetelenz starts digging furiously into the main pillar of the house to see whether there is some gold left. His strikes make the house collapse, burying Svetelenz, the Master and his wife with the treasure under the rubble. Arno and Beate walk out of the forest into the light.

Cast
 Albert Steinrück as the Master Bell-founder
 Lucie Mannheim as his daughter, Beate
 Ilka Grüning as his wife, Anna
 Werner Krauss as Svetelenz
 Hans Brausewetter as Arno

Musical score
Pabst commissioned an original musical score from Max Deutsch for the film.  In structure, Deutsch's  was crafted in two formats: a film score and a stand-alone symphonic work.  The five act symphony survived because its manuscript  was donated to the Deutsches Filminstitut in 1982, shortly before Deutsch died.  In 2002, DeutschlandRadio Berlin collaborated with the Staatsphilharmonie Rheinland-Pfalz, conducted by Frank Strobel, to produce a record of "this extremely rare and totally unknown symphonic work". The recording became the foundation of a "synchronized restoration" of the film.  As film music the "piece is scored for a theater orchestra of the kind typically found in European cinemas of the day".  It brings to mind the work of Kurt Weill and Stefan Wolpe, and foreshadows Max Steiner's modernist film scores, adopting expressionist atonal twelve tone leitmotifs.  Mood setting and character are developed; pianos appear throughout.

References

External links

1923 films
1923 drama films
1923 directorial debut films
German silent feature films
German drama films
German black-and-white films
German Expressionist films
Films directed by G. W. Pabst
Films of the Weimar Republic
Silent drama films
1920s German films